Alfred Grütter (31 August 1860 – 30 January 1937) was a Swiss sports shooter who competed in the early 20th century. He participated in Shooting at the 1900 Summer Olympics in Paris and won a gold medal with the Military rifle team for Switzerland.

References

External links
 

1860 births
1937 deaths
Swiss male sport shooters
Olympic shooters of Switzerland
Olympic gold medalists for Switzerland
Olympic medalists in shooting
Medalists at the 1900 Summer Olympics
Medalists at the 1906 Intercalated Games
Shooters at the 1900 Summer Olympics
Shooters at the 1906 Intercalated Games
Place of birth missing
Place of death missing